Rafael Lara Grajales was a Mexican general who  represented the urban moderates, and with Alvaro Obregén supported General José María Sánchez. The municipality Rafael Lara Grajales, Puebla is named in his honour.

References

Mexican generals
Year of birth missing
Year of death missing